Choretrum is a genus of shrubs and small trees in the sandalwood family, Santalaceae. The genus is endemic to Australia.

Species include:
Choretrum candollei F.Muell. ex Benth. - White sour bush
Choretrum chrysanthum F.Muell.
Choretrum glomeratum R.Br. - Berry broombush, common sour bush
Choretrum lateriflorum R.Br. - Dwarf sour bush
Choretrum pauciflorum A.DC. - Dwarf sour bush
Choretrum pritzelii Diels
Choretrum spicatum F.Muell.

References

Santalaceae
Santalales genera
Taxa named by Robert Brown (botanist, born 1773)